The Women's singles competition of the 2000 Direct Line International Championships was part of the 26th edition of the Eastbourne International tennis tournament, Tier II of the 2000 WTA Tour. Natasha Zvereva was the defending champion but lost in the second round to Anna Kournikova. Julie Halard-Decugis won in the final 7–6(7–4), 6–4 against Dominique Van Roost.

Seeds
A champion seed is indicated in bold text while text in italics indicates the round in which that seed was eliminated. The top four seeds received a bye to the second round.

  Lindsay Davenport (quarterfinals)
  Nathalie Tauziat (quarterfinals)
  Amanda Coetzer (quarterfinals)
  Anna Kournikova (quarterfinals)
  Dominique Van Roost (final)
  Julie Halard-Decugis (champion)
  Ai Sugiyama (first round)
  Chanda Rubin (semifinals)

Draw

Final

Section 1

Section 2

References

External links
 2000 Direct Line International Championships Draw

Direct Line International Championships
Singles